Clinton is a city in Davis County, Utah, United States. It is part of the Ogden–Clearfield, Utah Metropolitan Statistical Area. The population was 23,386 at the 2020 United States census, up from 20,426 in 2010 census. Clinton started off as a sleepy farm town and grew rapidly during the 1990s and continues to experience rapid growth, with an estimated population of 23,597 in 2021.

Geography
Clinton is located in northern Davis County, bordered by Sunset to the east, Clearfield to the southeast, and West Point to the southwest. The northern border of Clinton is the Weber County line, with the city of Hooper to the northwest and Roy to the north and northeast.

History
Dry farming began in the area of Clinton in 1879. By 1881 there was a railroad station. In 1884 the Summit Basin Branch of the Church of Jesus Christ of Latter-day Saints was organized in Clinton.

A ward was organized in Clinton in May 1897, which was named Clinton.

Demographics

As of the census of 2020, there were 23,360 people, 6,689 households with an average household size of 3.47 residing in the city. The population density was 3,942.3 people per square mile (883.5/km2). The racial makeup of the city was 89.9% White, .9% African American, 0..1% Native American, 2.7% Asian and 5.5% from two or more races. Hispanic or Latino of any race were 11.7% of the population.

The median income for a household in the city was $90,397 and a per capita income of $29,934. About 2.9% of the population were below the poverty line.

Based on 2010 census date, the population was spread out, with 33.6% under 18, 11.7% from 18 to 24, 31.8% from 25 to 44, 14.8% from 45 to 64, and 4.0% who were 65 years of age or older. The median age was 25 years. For every 100 females, there were 101.9 males. For every 100 females aged 18 and over, there were 99.3 males.

See also

 List of cities and towns in Utah

References

External links

 

Cities in Utah
Cities in Davis County, Utah
Ogden–Clearfield metropolitan area
Populated places established in 1879